Ti-6Al-2Sn-4Zr-2Mo (UNS designation R54620), also known as Ti 6-2-4-2, is a near alpha titanium alloy known for its high strength and excellent corrosion resistance. It is often  used in the aerospace industry for creating high-temperature jet engines and the automotive industry to create high performance automotive valves.

Chemistry

Markets
 Aerospace
 Automobile

Applications
 High-temp jet engines
 Gas turbine compressor components (Blades, Discs, Spacers and Seals)
 High performance automotive valves
 Sheet metal parts in afterburners and hot airframe sections
 Aircraft brake parts (e.g. Boeing 787)

Specifications
 AMS: 4919, 4975, 4976, 4979, T 9047
 MIL-T : 9046, 9047
 MIL-F: 81556, 82142
 Werkstoff: 3.7145
 EN: 3.71450
 GE: B50TF22, B50TF21, C50TF7, B50TF22
 PWA: 1220
 DIN: 3.7164
 UNS: R54620

References

Titanium alloys